[[File:Mowbray3.svg|thumb|200px|Quartered arms of Stourton, Barons Mowbray: quarterly of six:
1st: Sable, a bend or between six fountains (Stourton);
2nd: Gules, on a bend between six cross-crosslets fitchy argent an escutcheon or charged with a demi-lion rampant pierced through the mouth by an arrow within a double tressure flory counterflory of the first (Howard);
3rd: Gules, a lion rampant argent (Mowbray);
4th: Sable, a lion rampant argent ducally crowned or (Segrave); *5th: Gules, three lions passant guardant in pale or armed and langued azure a label of three points argent (Plantagenet (Thomas of Brotherton, 1st Earl of Norfolk));
6th Gules, a lion rampant within a bordure engrailed or (Talbot)]]
William Stourton, 22nd Baron Stourton, 26th Baron Segrave, 25th Baron Mowbray (31 August 1895 – 7 May 1965) was a British peer and the son of Charles Stourton, 21st Baron Stourton, 25th Baron Segrave and 24th Baron Mowbray and Mary Constable.

He was a captain in the Grenadier Guards, and married Shelia Gully, granddaughter of William Gully, 1st Viscount Selby, in 1921. They had two children:

 Charles Edward Stourton, 23rd Baron Stourton, 27th Baron Segrave and 26th Baron Mowbray (born 11 March 1923, died 12 December 2006)
 Hon Patricia Winifred Mary Stourton (born 2 November 1924) who married Frederick Crowder.

Notes

References
 Kidd, Charles and Williamson, David (editors). Debrett's Peerage and Baronetage'' (1995 edition). London: St. Martin's Press, 1995, 

1895 births
1965 deaths
Barons Mowbray
26
22
Grenadier Guards officers
20th-century English nobility